Dissolution (2003) is a historical mystery novel by British author C. J. Sansom.  It is Sansom's first published novel, and the first in the Matthew Shardlake Series.  It was dramatised by BBC Radio 4 in 2012.

Background
Set in the 16th century during the dissolution of the monasteries, the book follows the lawyer Shardlake in his attempts to solve the murder of one of Thomas Cromwell's commissioners in the monastery at the fictional town of Scarnsea on the south coast of England.

Reception
Dissolution has been well received by critics, although there has been some criticism of the language and detail in the writing. "The best crime novel I have read this year" – Colin Dexter; "Remarkable...the sights, the voices, the very smell of this turbulent age seem to rise from the page" – P. D. James; "This is a humdinger of a whodunnit.  Read it!" – Colin Dexter; "This is historical fiction at its finest." – Peter Robinson. The US Library Journal review is more critical, commenting: "His novel is unrelentingly grim in tone, as the reader is forced to plod along with Shardlake and the other mostly unlikable characters."

Dissolution was nominated for the 2003 Crime Writers' Association (CWA) John Creasey Memorial Dagger, for first books by previously unpublished writers.  It was also nominated for the CWA Ellis Peters Historical Dagger in the same year.

Publication history 
2003, USA, Viking Books, Pub date April 2003, Hardback;
2003, UK, Macmillan, Pub date June 2003, Hardback;
2004, UK, Penguin Books, Pub date April 2004, Paperback;
2004, UK, Pan, Pub date August 2004, Paperback;
2007, UK, Macmillan Digital Audio, Pub date August 2007, Audiobook.

References 

2003 British novels
British crime novels
Novels by C. J. Sansom
Fiction set in the 16th century
British historical novels
Historical mystery novels
2003 debut novels
Viking Press books